Omer beže (Omer bey) is traditional song from Bosnia and Herzegovina.

Nada Mamula version 

Mamula recorded this song both for Jugoton (1958) and PGP RTB (1964).

Darko Lukač played harmonica in Jugoton, while Žarko Milanović traditional orchestra played music in PGP version.

Many years later, Mamula filmed the video.

Josipa Lisac version 

Her version was released in 1974. Song was recorded in Sarajevo during early 1974.

References 

Folk songs
Bosnia and Herzegovina music
1958 singles
1964 singles
1974 singles
Jugoton singles